Higher education in China is the largest in the world. By the end of 2021, there were over 3,000 colleges and universities, with over 44.3 million students enrolled in mainland China and 240 million Chinese citizens having received high education. The system includes Bachelors, Masters and Doctoral degrees, as well as non-degree programs, and is also open to foreign students.

The Ministry of Education of the People's Republic of China is the government authority for all matters pertaining to education and language. The ministry notes that higher education in China has played a significant part in economic growth, scientific progress and social development in the country "by bringing up large scale of advanced talents and experts for the construction of socialist modernization."

China is also a major destination for international students, being the most popular country in Asia for international students, the leading destination globally for Anglophone African students, and the second most popular in the world. In 2017, China surpassed the U.S. with the highest number of scientific publications. The country has the world's second highest number of universities in the U.S News & World Report Best Global Universities Rankings. In the 2021 CWTS Leiden Ranking edition, China had the largest number of universities (221) included in the ranking. China has dominated the QS BRICS University Rankings and the THE's Emerging Economies University Rankings, claiming seven of the top 10 spots for both rankings. China is also the most-represented nation overall. Regardless of various rankings of the Chinese universities, the Ministry of Education of China does not advocate, support or recognize any ranking published by other institutions.

There are 13 statutory types of academic degrees in China: Bachelor/Master/Doctor of Philosophy, Economics, Laws, Education, Arts, History, Science, Engineering, Agriculture, Medicine, Management, Military Science, and Fine Arts. These degree names are designated by the degree program's academic emphasis and the classification of disciplines.

In 2015, a tertiary education development initiative called Double First Class University Plan designed by the central government of the People's Republic of China was launched, which aims to comprehensively develop elite Chinese universities into world-class institutions by improving their faculty departments to world-class level by the end of 2050. The full list of the plan was published in September 2017, which includes 140 universities being approved as the Double First Class Universities, representing the top 5% of the total 3,012 universities and colleges in China.

History 

The traditional Chinese education system is based on legalist and Confucian ideals. The teaching of Confucius has shaped the overall Chinese mindset for the past 2500 years. But, other outside forces have played a large role in the nation's educational development. The First Opium War of 1840, for example, opened China to the rest of the world. As a result, Chinese intellectuals discovered the numerous western advances in science and technology. This new information greatly impacted the higher education system and curriculum.

Established in 1895 by a royal charter by Guangxu Emperor, Tianjin University is the first modern university in China. The university was established in October 1895 as Imperial Tientsin University (Chinese: 天津北洋西學學堂) by a royal charter of the Guangxu Emperor of Qing dynasty with Sheng Xuanhuai as its first president and later renamed Peiyang University. It was the first government-run university in modern China where western science and technology was its main focus. The school motto was "Seeking truth from facts" (实事求是). In 1951, followed by an order of the Chinese Communist government, the university was renamed Tianjin University and became one of the largest multidisciplinary engineering universities in China and one of the first 16 national key universities accredited by the nation in 1959.

Established in 1898, Peking University is the second modern university of China. It was founded as Imperial Peking University in 1898 in Beijing as a replacement of the ancient Guozijian, the national central institute of learning in China's traditional educational system. 

Meanwhile, Wuhan University also claimed that its predecessor Ziqiang Institute was the first modern higher education institution in China. On November 29, 1893, Zhang Zhidong submitted his memorial to Guangxu Emperor to request for approval to set up an institution designed for training students specializing in foreign languages, mathematics, science and business. After Ziqiang was founded in Wuchang, not only courses in foreign languages was taught, courses in science (chemical and mining courses starting from 1896) and business (business course starting from the very beginning) were also developed at the school. Later, although the school officially changed its name to Foreign Languages Institute in 1902, the school still offered courses in science and business.  In China, there had been some earlier schools specializing in foreign languages learning, such as Schools of Combined Learning in Beijing (founded in 1862), in Shanghai (founded in 1863), and in Guangzhou, founded in 1864, but few provided courses in other fields, which hardly qualified as modern education institutions. Some argued that Wuhan University can only traced its history back to 1913, when the National Wuchang Higher Normal College was established, but Wuhan University officially recognized its establishment as in 1893, relying on the abundance of historical documentation and the experts' endorsement.
In 1895, Sheng Xuanhuai submitted a memorial to Guangxu Emperor to request for approval to set up a modern higher education institution in Tianjin. After approval on October 2, 1895, Peiyang Western Study School was founded by him and American educator Charles Daniel Tenney and later developed to Peiyang University. In 1896, Sheng Xuanhuai delivered his new memorials to Guangxu Emperor to make suggestion that two official modern higher education institutions should be established in Beijing and Shanghai. In the same year, he founded Nanyang Public School in Shanghai by an imperial edict issued by Guangxu Emperor. The institution initially included elementary school, secondary school, college, and a normal school. Later the institution changed its name to Jiao Tong University (also known as Chiao Tung University). In the 1930s, the university was well known in the world as the "Eastern MIT" due to its reputation of nurturing top engineers and scientists. In the 1950s, part of this university was moved to Xi'an, an ancient capital city in northwest China, and was established as Xi'an Jiaotong University; the part of the university remaining in Shanghai was renamed Shanghai Jiao Tong University. These two universities have developed independently since then.

Tianjin University (1895) celebrated its 100th anniversary in 1995, which would predate the establishment of Peking University. Jiao Tong University (in all Beijing Jiaotong University, Southwest Jiaotong University in Chengdu, Shanghai Jiao Tong University and Xi'an Jiaotong University) followed in 1996. As of 2022, other national key universities as a part of former Project 985, such as Sichuan University (1896), Zhejiang University (1897), Peking University (1898), Shandong University (1901), Beijing Normal University (1902), Nanjing University (1902), Southeast University (1902), Hunan University (1903), Fudan University (1905), China Agricultural University (1905), Tongji University (1907), Lanzhou University (1909), Tsinghua University (1911), Nankai University (1919), Harbin Institute of Technology (1920), and Xiamen University (1921) also recently celebrated their hundredth anniversaries, one after another.

Other notable and public universities also celebrated their 100 anniversaries, including Hebei Medical University (1894), Xi'an University of Architecture and Technology (1895), Xinxiang Medical University (1896), Huazhong Agricultural University (1898), Wuhan University of Technology (1898), Wuhan University of Science and Technology (1898), Soochow University (1900), Guizhou University (1902), Jiangnan University (1902), Nanjing Agricultural University (1902), Nanjing Normal University (1902), Northwest University (China) (1902), Shanxi University (1902), Nanjing Forestry University (1902), Taiyuan University of Technology (1902), Central China Normal University (1903), Hebei University of Technology (1903),Jinan University (1906), University of Shanghai for Science and Technology (1906), Sichuan Agricultural University (1906), Southwest University (1906), Dalian Maritime University (1909), Shanghai Maritime University (1909), South China Agricultural University (1909), China University of Mining and Technology (1909), Shanghai Ocean University (1912), Henan University (1912), Hohai University (1915), Peking Union Medical College (1917), Shanghai University of Finance and Economics (1917), Central Academy of Fine Arts (1918), Shanghai University (1922), and Yunnan University (1922).

Soviet influence in the early 1950s brought all higher education under government leadership. Research was separated from teaching. The government also introduced a central plan for a nationally unified instruction system, i.e. texts, syllabi, etc. The impact of this shift can still be seen today. Chinese higher education continues its struggle with excessive departmentalisation, segmentation, and overspecialisation in particular.

From 1967 to 1976, China’s Cultural Revolution took another toll on higher education, which was devastated more than any other sector of the country.  The enrollment of postsecondary students can be used as example to illustrate the impacts. The number dropped from 674,400 to 47,800. This has had a major impact on education in the 21st century. The decline in educational quality was profound.

In 1977, Deng Xiaoping made the decision of resuming the National Higher Education Entrance Examination (Gaokao), having profound impact on Chinese higher education in history.  From the 1980s on, Chinese higher education has undergone a series of reforms that have slowly brought improvement. The government found that schools lacked the flexibility and autonomy to provide education according to the needs of the society. Structural reform of higher education consists of five parts:
reforms of education provision
management
investment
recruitment and job-placement
inner-institute management—the most difficult.
The reforms aim to provide higher education institutions more autonomy and the ability to better meet the needs of students. Instead of micromanagement, the state aims to provide general planning.

The Provisional Regulations Concerning the Management of Institutions of Higher Learning, promulgated by the State Council in 1986, led to a number of changes in administration and adjusted educational opportunity, direction and content. Reform allowed universities and colleges to:
 choose their own teaching plans and curricula
 to accept projects from or cooperate with other socialist establishments for scientific research and technical development in setting up "combines" involving teaching, scientific research, and production
 to suggest appointments and removals of vice presidents and other staff members;
 to take charge of the distribution of capital construction investment and funds allocated by the state
 to be responsible for the development of international exchanges by using their own funds.

Reforms picked up the pace in 2000, with the state aiming to complete the reform of 200 universities operating under China's ministries and start 15 university-based scientific technology parks.

Present day 
Since 1998, 39 leading research universities have been targeted by the Chinese government to become “world-class” — including Peking and Tsinghua universities of the part of Project 985. To achieve that goal, the government promised to increase the education allocation in the national budget by 1 percent a year for each of the five years following 1998. When CPC General secretary Chinese president Jiang Zemin attended the 100th anniversary ceremony at Peking University (Beida) in 1998 and the 90th anniversary ceremony at Tsinghua University in 2001, he emphasized this ambitious goal of advancing several of China's higher education institutions into the top tier of universities worldwide in the next several decades.

In 2019, the Ministry of Education (MOE) reported that there were 2,956 higher education institutions (HEIs) across the country. 2,688 were regular HEIs (including 257 independent colleges), 1,265 universities offered Bachelor’s degrees, and 828 institutions offered postgraduate programs. In addition, there were 757 non-state colleges/universities (including 257 independent colleges and 1 college for adults). The MOE also reported 40.02 million students enrolled in higher education, an increase of 1.69 million from the year prior.

Despite the large number of HEIS, the higher education system does not meet the needs of 85 percent of the college-age population.

In China, according to ownership-based categories of HEIs, the higher education can be divided into two categories---State-owned or government-owned HEIs, including Regular HEIs, Independent Institutions, Higher Vocational Colleges, Adult HEIs, and non-government or private universities Regular HEIs is the cornerstone in China’s higher education, while private universities development could not be ignored.

Types of colleges and universities

'Double First Class University Plan' universities 

In October 2015, The State Council of the People's Republic of China published the 'Overall Plan for Promoting the Construction of World First Class Universities and First Class Disciplines' (Overall Plan for Double First Class University Plan), which aims to comprehensively develop elite Chinese universities into world-class institutions by building and strengthening their disciplines and faculties, and eventually developing all the universities included in this plan into 'world-first-class' universities by 2050, making new arrangements for the development of higher education in China. The Double First Class University Plan represents a whole new way of ranking universities in China, replacing previous projects such as 'Project 211', 'Project 985' or 'Project Characteristic Key Disciplines'.

In September 2017, the full list of the Double First Class University Plan universities and disciplines was published by the Ministry of Education of China, the Ministry of Finance of China and the National Development and Reform Commission of China, which includes 140 elite Chinese universities (accounted for less than 5% of the higher education institutions in China).

Rankings and international reputation 
The Ministry of Education of China does not advocate, support or recognize any ranking published by other institutions. The quality of universities and higher education in China is internationally recognized as China has established educational cooperation and exchanges with 188 countries and regions and 46 major international organizations, and signed agreements with 54 countries such as the US, British, Germany, Australia and Canada on mutual recognition of higher education qualifications and academic degrees.

The country has the world's second highest number of universities in the Academic Ranking of World Universities's top 500 universities and in the U.S News & World Report Best Global Universities Rankings. In 2017, China surpassed the U.S. with the highest number of scientific publications. In the 2021 CWTS Leiden Ranking edition, China had the largest number of universities (221) including in the ranking. China has dominated the QS BRICS University Rankings and the THE's Emerging Economies University Rankings, claiming seven of the top 10 spots for both rankings. China is also the most-represented nation overall. As of 2020, China tops the QS Asia University Rankings list with over 120 universities including in the ranking, and five Chinese universities appear in the Asia Top 10, which is more than any other country. There were 22 Chinese universities on lists of the global top 200 in the 2020 Academic Ranking of World Universities, behind only the United States in terms of the overall representation. 

According to THE China Subject Ratings 2020 conducted by the Time Higher Education World University Rankings, Chinese universities are on a par with their counterparts in the US, the UK, and Germany across 89 subjects ahead of others like France, South Korea, and Russia. The country scores above the global average of B score, with 46 percent of its universities’ grades were A+, A, or A−, only slightly behind the US (49 percent). The QS rankings by subjects 2021 indicated that universities in China now have a record number in the top 50 universities in the world across all 51 subjects in five broad discipline areas: “Arts and Humanities”, “Natural Sciences”, “Social Sciences and Management”, “Engineering & Technology”, and “Life Sciences and Medicines”. In 2020, five Chinese universities appear in the Global Top 10 by the numbers of the International patent applications via the World Intellectual Property Organization (WIPO), which is more than any country.

This reflects the continual development of Chinese higher education and research quality of universities over time.

On 18 September 2020, the members of a Chinese expert group, which was headed by Lin Huiqing, Chairman of the Medical Education Expert Committee of the Ministry of Education and former Vice Minister of the Ministry of Education, unanimously agreed that Tsinghua University has been fully established as a world-class university.

Admission process 
A student's score in the National Higher Education Entrance Examination (Gaokao) is the primary consideration used for admission into universities in China. Regional education development imbalance leads to the different treatment of students from different regions. Enrollment rules in China are based on the scores on the Gaokao, but a given university's minimum score threshold varies depending on the province an applicant is from and the degree of competition in applicants from the province. The more you have more top universities in a region, the better chances its students will be enrolled into a top university. The university admission quotes are not based on the area's population but the university’s enrollment plan. In some populous provinces, the competition is extremely fierce, while, in some areas with more institutions, such as Beijing or Shanghai, access to a prestigious university is more attainable.

International students
With China's rising national strength and popularity of Chinese in the world, China as a study destination attracts thousands of foreign students abroad and the number of foreign students continues to grow rapidly in recent years. Since 2005, China has become the most popular country in Asia and the sixth largest country in the world in hosting international students. The top ten countries with students studying in China include South Korea, Japan, USA, Vietnam, Thailand, Russia, India, Indonesia, France and Pakistan. According to 2014 data from Ministry of Education of the People’s Republic of China, there were more than 377,054 foreign students from 203 countries or regions study in all the 31 provinces in China, with an increase of 5.77% over the same period last year. In 2015, a record breaking 397,635 international students went to China, solidifying its position as the third most popular destination country after only the UK and the US for overseas students. While US and the UK attracted nearly one-third of all globally mobile students, their leadership is under threat in the "Third Wave" of political turbulence and intense competition from English-medium Instruction or English-taught Programs in countries like China and Continental Europe. In 2014, the largest source of foreign students came from Asia, accounting almost 60% of the total, followed by Europe 18%, Africa 11% respectively. For individual country, the top three countries of origins were South Korea (62,923), United States (24,203) and Thailand (21,296). Only 10% of foreign students receive Chinese Government Scholarship and the rest 90% are self-funded.

In 2018, according to the most recent statistics from the Ministry of Education of the People’s Republic of China, China (hosting 492,185 international students in 2018) has overtaken the UK (hosting 458,520 international students in 2018 according to Study in UK) to become the host of second largest international students population, after the USA. In 2018, International students have enrolled in over 1004 higher education institutions in China.

Study Abroad 
Wealthier Chinese families are more likely to send their kids abroad to receive higher education. Free academic atmosphere, high-quality teaching and new way to cultivate talents---all these advantages contribute to the flood of Chinese students arriving in United States, United Kingdom, Germany and other developed countries. Chinese students have been the largest foreign group in USA since 2010, with 157,588 arriving between 2010 and 2011. The same situation happened in United Kingdom and Germany. Western education will likely remain the leading choice for Chinese students due to its cross-disciplinary fields and development of critical thinking.

China has a strong demand for postsecondary education, to the extent that its university system currently cannot keep pace with demand. Consequently, universities in the United States, Europe and Australia play a significant role by partnering with Chinese universities, aggressively recruiting Chinese students for study in their host countries, increasing the number of students they send to study in China, and adding to their presence on the mainland, either through official foreign campuses or extensions. Australia, United Kingdom, and other Asian countries are already making strides into this market.

Partnering can be economically salubrious, either if the scholars choose to stay in the host country or return to the mainland. Most Chinese students who go abroad are among the best and brightest from their home country. Thus, if they choose to stay, they can benefit the economy of their host country when they gain employment and become members of their new communities. If they leave, they may maintain the contacts and connections they may have established, and also leave a positive impression on their hosts.

Funding
Compared with commonwealth countries’ tuition, tuition of China’s higher education is relatively inexpensive. Nevertheless, the Chinese per capita income is much lower than western countries, so there are still some students from rural and mountainous areas facing funding problems. Chinese government has taken some measures to ensure the smooth enrollment of this group, like students loans, part-time jobs within campus, etc. It's seldom the case that college students discontinue their studies because of tuition or cost of living.

Considering institution funding, it varies dramatically among different universities. In order to adapt to the fierce global competition in education, the Ministry of Education of the People’s Republic of China initiated Project 211 in mid 1990s aimed at strengthening about 100 institutions of higher education and key disciplinary areas as a national priority for the 21st century.  On May 4, 1998, President Jiang Zemin declared that “China must have a number of first-rate universities of international advanced level”, so Project 985 was launched.  The total number of Project 985 is 39 and all of them belong to 211 project at the same time.   The initial aim is to promote China’s educational competitiveness and establishment of a number of leading disciplines in the world. In October 2015, the central government of China announced a new plan called Double First Class University Plan to promote the elite universities in China and replace previous Project 211 and Project 985. In September 2017, the full list of Double First Class University Plan was published, which aims to comprehensively develop elite Chinese universities into world-class institutions by building and strengthening their disciplines and faculties, and eventually developing all the universities included in this plan into 'world-first-class' universities by 2050. 140 Chinese elite universities are included in this plan. 

Meanwhile, it is also the beginning to widen the gap and cause the imbalanced distribution of scientific research funds between key universities and common public universities. Within the project, it is not only a glory but also hints numerous tangible benefits. The majority of public universities’ development lies to all levels of government funds. Entry in this project means you will gain more research funds. According to another data from Ministry of Education of the People’s Republic of China, from 2009 to 2013, the total government research funding for 39 Project 985 institutions is 13.9 billion RMB, with 73 Project 211 Institutions approximately 5.1 billion RMB and rest of 670 common undergraduate colleges only 7.9 billion RMB. In June 2016, the Ministry of Education of China reconfirmed that both Project 211 and Project 985 had been abolished and replaced by the Double First Class University Plan.

The majority of Chinese universities are state-owned universities. The financial support from government level, in most circumstances, decides one university’s development. The imbalanced distribution of scientific research funds will deepen the gap among universities.

Challenges

Between 2002 and 2020, the percentage of young adults holding a higher diploma increased from 15% to 54%. This aggravates graduate unemployment, underemployment, overqualification, credentialism and educational inflation. As a result of the predicament of unemployment, educators, students, and the Ministry of Education is promoting training in skills for the market economy that would complement the more traditional classroom learning and the focus on "hard" credentials. In Chinese universities, students clubs and special training activities aim to cultivate soft skills in students, assisting in promoting resilient personalities and life skills as preparation for the uncertainties in the job market.

Remark:

See also

Academic ranks in China
Double First Class University Plan
State Key Laboratory
Project 985
Project 211
Plan 111
C9 League
Academic Ranking of World Universities compiled by Shanghai Jiao Tong University
Ant Tribes, college graduates challenges launching their career
CERNET
College and university rankings
Education in China
History of science and technology in China
List of universities in China
Thousand Talents Program
Changjiang (Yangtze River) Scholar award

Notes and references

Further reading
Agelasto Michael and Bob Adamson (eds). Higher Education in Post-Mao China. Hong Kong University Press, 1998. 
Hayhoe, Ruth . China's Universities and the Open Door. Armonk, N.Y.: M.E. Sharpe,  1989. xii, 249 p.p. . On the early stages of reform in higher education.
Hayhoe, Ruth. China's Universities, 1895-1995 : A Century of Cultural Conflict. New York: Garland Pub., Garland Reference Library of Social Science,  1996. xxv, 299pp. . The competing models of education before and after 1949.
 Li Mei . "Cross-border flows of students for higher education: Push–pull factors and motivations of mainland Chinese students in Hong Kong and Macau". Higher Education, 2007
 Rui Yang. Third Delight: The internationalization of higher education in China. Routledge, 2002. 
 Zha Qiang (Ed.) (2013). Education in China. Educational History, Models, and Initiatives. Gt Barrington, MA: Berkshire Publishing
Zhou Ji, Minister of the Ministry of Education. Higher Education in China. Cengage Learning; 1st edition (July 30, 2005) 
Higher Education In China - Ministry of Education
Higher education in China
Higher Education in China: The Next Super Power is Coming of Age
Higher Education in China - A Growth Paradox?
Higher Education in China in light of massification and demographic change
China’s impressive strides in higher education
China's bid for world domination
China’s higher education transformation and its global implications
Higher education in China faces competition
China's Vocational Universities. ERIC Digest. by Ding, Anning

External links
China Higher Education Network - Higher education reform and development
Ministry of Education The People's Republic of China
China Higher-education Student Information and Career Center (CHESICC)
The China Education Blog - Topical issues blog for China's education sector
 - Higher Education in China in the light of massification and demographic change
University in Turmoil: The Political Economy of Shenzhen University by Michael Agelasto (1998) 
Educational Disengagement: Undermining Academic Quality at a Chinese University by Michael Agelasto (1998) 

 
China